Chambersburg Township is located in Pike County, Illinois. As of the 2018 census, its population was 241 and it contained 89 housing units.

Chambersburg Township was named for a family of first settlers.

Geography

Population Distribution
the township has 138 males and 103 females

References

External links

City-data.com
Illinois State Archives

Townships in Pike County, Illinois
Townships in Illinois